The DFL-Supercup or German Super Cup is a one-off football match in Germany that features the winners of the Bundesliga championship and the DFB-Pokal. The DFL-Supercup is run by the Deutsche Fußball Liga (English: German Football League).

History and rules

In 1997 it was superseded by a league cup called DFB-Ligapokal. In 2008, although not officially sanctioned by any footballing body, the match returned as the T-Home Supercup, featuring Bundesliga and DFB-Pokal double winners Bayern Munich and fellow DFB-Pokal finalists Borussia Dortmund. The match was a one-year replacement for the DFB-Ligapokal, which was cancelled for one season, due to schedule crowding caused by UEFA Euro 2008. The Supercup was reinstated from the 2010–11 season at the annual general meeting of the German Football League on 10 November 2009. The Supercup from then on was called the DFL-Supercup because it is now run by the Deutsche Fußball Liga, having previously been called the DFB-Supercup because it was run by the Deutscher Fußball-Bund (English: German Football Association).

Since 2010, in contrast to the DFB-Supercup, if one team wins the double (league and cup), the winner plays the runner-up of the Bundesliga. No extra time is played in the case of a draw after 90 minutes, the match is then decided by a penalty shoot-out. The match typically is played at the home of the cup holders, or the Bundesliga runners-up in the case a team wins the double, though this is not a rule, as the DFL ultimately decides on the venue.

Matches

Below is a list of the Super Cup winners. Since 2010, if one team wins the domestic double, then league runners-up are invited as the second team.

Performances

Performance by team

Performance by qualification

Top goalscorers
Bold indicates active players in German football.

Unofficial matches
The German champions met the cup winners several times without the match being officially recognized.

See also
DFV-Supercup

Notes

References

External links

 
2
Germany
Recurring sporting events established in 1987
1987 establishments in West Germany